In geometry, the disphenocingulum or pentakis elongated gyrobifastigium is one of the Johnson solids. It is one of the elementary Johnson solids that do not arise from "cut and paste" manipulations of the Platonic and Archimedean solids.

Cartesian coordinates 
Let a ≈ 0.76713 be the second smallest positive root of the polynomial
 

Then, Cartesian coordinates of a disphenocingulum with edge length 2 are given by the union of the orbits of the points

under the action of the group generated by reflections about the xz-plane and the yz-plane.

References

External links
 

Johnson solids